.al is the Internet country code top-level domain (ccTLD) for Albania. It is administered by the Electronic and Postal Communications Authority of Albania (AKEP).

AKEP recommends that .al domain registrations be performed with one of the AKEP accredited registrars. There are also international registrars that resell .al domains. Domain names should be between 2 and 63 characters. Although the Albanian language has a number of special characters, the registry has not enabled the use of IDN characters.

2nd level registrations

In the past, registrations were not permitted directly at the second level, but a few existing names were "grandfathered"; they were uniti.al, tirana.al, soros.al, upt.al and inima.al.

In 2012 registrars started to resell .al domain names widely making them popular outside Albania as domain hacks.
 
In November 2014 the registry released two character domain names allowing for free landrush.

3rd level registrations

Registrations used to be only beneath the second-levels, i.e., .com.al, .net.al, .org.al, and .edu.al labeled appropriately for the type of organisation, but many now exist directly below .al.

Whois servers
As of November 1st, 2019, the Autoriteti i Komunikimeve Elektronike dhe Postare (AKEP) has mandated that all AKEP accredited registrars begin verifying and updating the WHOIS contact information for all new domain registrations and Registrant contact modifications.

Domain figures
The table below lists the total registration figures as of December 2017.

List of authorized hosts

References

External links
 IANA .al whois information
 AKEP Electronic and Postal Communications Authority (AKEP)
 Host.al  Accredited Registrar (Host.al)
 WebHost.al  Accredited Registrar (WebHost.al)
 IRegister  Accredited Registrar (IRegister)

Country code top-level domains
Telecommunications in Albania
Computer-related introductions in 1992
Council of European National Top Level Domain Registries members

sv:Toppdomän#A